is a Japanese manga artist and actor.

Biography
Born in Amakusa, Kumamoto Prefecture, Ebisu grew up in Nagasaki. During childhood, he experienced the trauma of post-World War II Japan and atomic weapons. He drew manga since he was a child, influenced by Osamu Tezuka and Mitsuteru Yokoyama, being especially an avid reader of the latter's series Tetsujin 28-go. In the late 1950s, Ebisu discovered the emerging  genre and was immediately affected. "My interests and my themes changed", he recalled, "I moved from giant robots to human beings and realistic stories." Furthermore, he attributed great importance to the influence of American action films, in particular The Last Command directed by Frank Lloyd and starring John Wayne, which inspired him to invent increasingly original and intense representations in the use of works.

In 1970, he moved to Tokyo. His manga appeared for the first time in the avant-garde manga magazine Garo on 19 August 1973, at the end of the first golden period of Japanese underground manga, and his grotesque and darkly surreal works immediately became a mainstay of the genre. Themes and drawings are marked by antisocial, anti-realistic, and irrational aspects. Some of his featured works include the  series.

In recent years, Ebisu became mainly known as a television star, collaborating with Takeshi Kitano.

See also
 
 
 Garo

References

External links
 
  
 Yoshikazu Ebisu at the Media Arts Database

Living people
1947 births
Manga artists from Kumamoto Prefecture
Japanese male television actors